The Mary Lee Davis House is a historic house at 410 Cowles Street in Fairbanks, Alaska.  It is now the Alaska Heritage House, a bed and breakfast inn.  It is a -story bungalow-style house, set at the northern corner of Cowles and 5th Avenue in a residential area of the city.  The exact construction date of the house is uncertain: it was probably complete by 1916, but construction may have begun as early as 1906; it is acknowledged as the city's oldest occupied residence.  The unfinished house was purchased by writer Mary Lee Davis and her husband, who finished the building and added a number of its distinctive touches, including the city's first residential coal heating system.  After a period of ownership by the Fairbanks Exploration Company, during which it was home to company executives, it went through a succession of owners before being converted to a bed and breakfast.

The house was listed on the National Register of Historic Places in 1982.

See also
National Register of Historic Places listings in Fairbanks North Star Borough, Alaska

References

1916 establishments in Alaska
Buildings and structures in Fairbanks, Alaska
Bungalow architecture in Alaska
Houses completed in 1913
Houses in Fairbanks North Star Borough, Alaska
Houses on the National Register of Historic Places in Alaska
Buildings and structures on the National Register of Historic Places in Fairbanks North Star Borough, Alaska